Beau Blackstone is a 1973 historical thriller novel by the British writer Derek Lambert, published under the pen name Richard Falkirk. It is the third in a series of six novels featuring Edmund Blackstone, a member of the Bow Street Runners in the pre-Victorian era. Blackstone goes undercover amongst a gang of navvies working on a new railway, and is called on for plans to thwart the first Great Train Robbery.

References

Bibliography
 David Nash & Anne-Marie Kilday. Law, Crime and Deviance Since 1700: Micro-Studies in the History of Crime. Bloomsbury Publishing, 2016.

1973 British novels
Novels by Derek Lambert 
British historical novels
British thriller novels
Novels set in London
Novels set in the 1820s
Novels about rail transport
Stein and Day books